Armando Muñoz Calero y López (15 February 1908 – 8 November 1978) was a Spanish physician and falangist politician. He was a member of the Cortes Españolas during the Francoist dictatorship, while he also served as president of the provincial government in Madrid and as deputy-mayor of the Madrid City Council.

Biography 

Armando Muñoz Calero was born on 15 February 1908 in Águilas, Murcia. A trained physician, he worked in Lorca for a time.

A hardline falangist who held the post of FET y de las JONS' national's inspector of health, Muñoz Calero joined the Blue Division siding with Nazi Germany to fight the Soviet Union in the Eastern Front of World War II. He served as front-line surgeon in the division's medical corps. He chaired the Organización Médica Colegial from 1945 to 1946.

He was a member of the Cortes Españolas from 1946 to 1952, again from 1955 to 1958 (in his capacity as National Chief of the ), and finally from 1964 to 1971 (as member of the National Council of the Movement). He became the president of the Spanish Football Federation on 20 May 1947.

He would go on to hold the vice-presidency of the Atlético de Madrid in the 1960s.
He died on 8 November 1978 in Madrid.

References 
Citations

Bibliography
  
 
 
 

Members of the Cortes Españolas
Madrid city councillors
Atlético Madrid
1908 births
1978 deaths
20th-century Spanish physicians
Spanish military doctors
Presidents of the Spanish Football Federation